Matt Cameron is an American musician, serving as drummer for rock bands Pearl Jam and Soundgarden. He also has contributed to other musical projects.

Solo discography

Skin Yard discography

Soundgarden discography

Tone Dogs discography

Temple of the Dog discography

Hater discography

Wellwater Conspiracy discography

Pearl Jam discography

Harrybu McCage discography

Ten Commandos discography

Contributions and collaborations

References

Rock music discographies
Discographies of American artists